Robert Samuel Rojas Chávez (born 30 April 1996), is a Paraguayan professional footballer who plays as a centre-back for Argentine Primera División club River Plate and the Paraguay national team.

Club career
Rojas, who arrived in Guaraní when he was 17 years old acknowledged that he was about to leave football more than once because he missed his family, played as a right back for most of his youth training, but in his second year in the Asunción team he was run for playing as a centre back. Therefore, it is characterized by its great speed.

The one born in the small town of Peguahomi became a key part of the Cacique team, especially since Julio César Cáceres - his great referent in the position- was suspended by doping at the beginning of March and a place was left vacant in the rear.

The defender, is one of the young player with greater projection in the football of his country.

International career
On 2 March 2019, Rojas received a call-up to the Paraguay national team from Eduardo Berizzo ahead of that month's friendlies with Peru and Mexico. He made his international debut on 5 September 2019, in a 2–0 loss to Japan.

International goals
Scores and results list Paraguay's goal tally first.

References

External links

1996 births
Living people
Paraguayan footballers
People from Concepción Department, Paraguay
Association football defenders
Club Guaraní players
Club Atlético River Plate footballers
Paraguayan Primera División players
Argentine Primera División players
Paraguayan expatriate footballers
Paraguayan expatriate sportspeople in Argentina
Expatriate footballers in Argentina
Paraguay international footballers